Martin Svintek (born 17 February 1975) is a retired Slovak football midfielder.

References

1975 births
Living people
Slovak footballers
MŠK Rimavská Sobota players
MFK Lokomotíva Zvolen players
FK Dukla Banská Bystrica players
Vác FC players
FK Železiarne Podbrezová players
Nemzeti Bajnokság I players
Association football midfielders
Slovak expatriate footballers
Expatriate footballers in Hungary
Slovak expatriate sportspeople in Hungary